Thailand is a country located in Mainland Southeast Asia with a history of over 700 years and is mainly Buddhist (Theravada Buddhism). Many people, however; still believe in and respect superstition, the supernatural, miracles, magic, animism, amulets, and the like.

This is a list of locations in Thailand which are reported to be haunted or paranormal.

Bangkok Metropolitan Region

 Government House of Thailand: The offices of the Prime Minister of Thailand and the appointed cabinet ministers. It is rumored to have many ghosts and paranormal activities.
 Phitsanulok Mansion: The official residence of the Prime Minister of Thailand. Like the neighboring government house, the mansion is rumored to be haunted by many ghosts.
 Crime Suppression Division Jail Cell: Many prisoners claim to have seen a male ghost wearing a red t-shirt in the jail cells, especially by prisoners on their first night. This ghost is said to persuade others to suicide by hanging.
 Lumphini Park: A 360-rai (57.6-hectares or 142-acres) park in Bangkok, Thailand. It is said there is a haunted wood house in the park. At night people often heard a shrill cry from inside the park. During the protest of the People's Democratic Reform Committee (PDRC) while the protesters stayed in the park, some protesters experienced a haunting and a volunteer security guard was possessed at dawn.
 Ratchaprasong Intersection: A road intersection in Pathum Wan District, downtown Bangkok. It is both a popular tourist destination and a world-class shopping center. This place is rumored to be cursed or haunted, since the site of Prince Chudadhuj Dharadilok's palace in the past. It is currently home to eight Hindu shrines, including Erawan Shrine.
  Soi Watcharapol: Soi (side-road branching off a major road) in Bang Khen District, Bangkok. A secluded location and well known to have several haunted houses.
 Wat Maha But: Wat (Thai temple) in Suan Luang District, Bangkok. Location established the Mae Nak Phra Khanong shrine and home to a famous Thai ghost legend.
 Wat Samian Nari: A temple in Chatuchak District, Bangkok. There are many urban legends about women in black who appear here at night. They will call a taxi from Ratchadapisek Road to this temple, but then disappeared mysteriously. It is believed that these two women are sisters named "Chulee Thipsuksri" and "Sulee Thipsuksri" who died when their train was broken into two pieces. The most recent sighting happened on the dawn of July 15, 2016 at about 4:00 am. Those who witnessed the incident told his story on Pantip.com.
 Wat Don Cemetery: A cemetery of Wat Don Kuson in Sathon District. In the past, it was a place that was rumored to be haunted.
 Talapat Suksa School: The abandoned school building is located on Phraeng Nara Road, Phra Nakhon District, its site in the popular tourist area and is the center of a number of famous restaurants in the old city area. It is named after née of Princess Srinagarindra. It was once the theater of Prince Narathip Praphanphong. People who live in this neighborhood see the ghost of an actress and also saw in the dream again.
 Abbhantripaja's Palace: The palace of Princese Abbhantripaja, a daughter of King Rama V, that was deserted after she dies. At night someone hears a woman cry or the sound of a swimmer, or sometimes lights can be turned on-off by themselves. At present it became both a café, a library and a part of Chartthaipattana Party headquarters.
 Wat Suthat: A temple built in the reign of King Rama I, it is known as royal temple of the first grade and is a popular tourist attraction. There was a story about a tall hungry ghost called Preta. However, this may have been the Giant Swing located in front of the temple, and the morning fog may have caused this sighting.
 Wat Suwannaram: Old temple built in the Ayutthaya period. It is located in Bangkok Noi District on Bangkok's Thonburi side (west bank of Chao Phraya River). It was the capital during the reign of King Taksin. During that time it was used to executions of prisoners of war, who were primarily Burmese soldiers. Recently, local people have seen Burmese ghosts haunting. According to rumor, there are Preta on the bell tower, a headless male ghost wearing chang kben, and a female ghost on the pier in the middle of night.
 Ratchadaphisek Road: A major road in Chatuchak District, Bangkok. The curve of the road, opposite to the Criminal Court, is a place with a large banyan tree and spirit house, where car accidents often take place. It has been called the "Curve of Hundred Corpses".
 Sathorn Unique Tower: Unfinished skyscraper from 1997 financial crisis, located in downtown Bangkok by the Chao Phraya River. Notable for its ghost stories. Its story was adapted into the 2017 film The Promise.
 Thawi Watthana Deserted House: A deserted house located in Thawi Watthana District in suburban Bangkok. In 2015 seven teenagers went ghost hunting here. After backing out, they gradually died from accidents such as motorcycle crash or a house fire until only two people were alive in 2017. This is similar to the case in the Hollywood film Final Destination. At each accident, there are witnesses claiming to see a mysterious woman with long hair wearing a white dress. A medium claimed that this is a vengeful spirit named "Dao" or "Deuan" that followed and killed these teenagers.
 Mahidol University: One of the leading universities in Thailand located in Tambon Salaya, Amphoe Phutthamonthon, Nakhon Pathom province. This place was a funeral home during the reign of King Rama IV and King Rama V. There are now many respected shrines here. Many students have been thought to be possessed or haunted.
 Thai Lemon Foods Factory: Lemon juice factory located in Tambon Nong Sam Wang, Amphoe Nong Suea, Pathum Thani province. Factory's CCTV captured a luminous floating head with gut female spirit called Krasue on the night of July 22, 2008 at about 11:30 pm. Locals insist that it looks like an old woman who lives alone in the neighborhood.

Central

 Ayutthaya Historical Park: Historical areas have been the ancient capital of Thai history for over 400 years from the 14th to the 18th century. There are many dynasties and monarchs. There are many rumors about cursed treasures and ghosts watching these treasures was called Pu Som Fao Sap. Today there are many abandoned places that are the source of these rumors, such as Wat Phra Sri Sanphet, Wat Kra Sai, Tri Muk Pavilion, Wat Ratchaburana, Wat Kudi Dao etc. Especially at Wat Kudi Dao, Prince Birabongse Bhanudej saw Pu Som Fao Sap is the headless male ghost here in December 1960. He talked about this in later years and it made him change his ghostly attitude throughout life.
 Sermon Hall of Wat Ban Kae: Sermon hall of Wat Ban Kae in Amphoe Sawaeng Ha, Ang Thong province. It was built in 1969 but has not been completed to date. Because all builders were haunted, and also the monks and the villagers were also haunted. Currently it is abandoned.
 Wat Khao Kaeo: Located in Tambon Ongkharak, Amphoe Pho Thong, Ang Thong province. In early August 2012, a maechi had seen a Preta at this temple as she was praying. The villagers, including the police, have confirmed that they have been seen for many years and they were terrified.
 Ang Thong Antique Bed: Antique wooden bed more than 100 years old of Wat Thanon, Tambon Phong Pheng, Amphoe Pa Mok, Ang Thong province, No one knows who owns it, but the locals who sleep or sit on this bed must face many inexplicable things until die.
 Kanchanaburi Deep Jungle: Deep jungle in Kanchanaburi province, the border with Myanmar. The villagers who live here say that, in this jungle there's a legendary fruit that's a beautiful young women named Nariphon. It has been searched by popular TV shows Destination Truth in 2011.
 Kaeng Krachan National Park: Is the largest national park of Thailand located on the area of Phetchaburi province. It is on the border with Myanmar, contiguous with the Tanintharyi Nature Reserve. In the mid-2011, three Royal Thai Army helicopters crashed in only nine days, there were 17 deaths. An ethnic group Karen believe this is unsuitable place according to the beliefs of Chinese's Feng Shui, similar to Bermuda Triangle.

Eastern
 Mathayom Taksin Rayong School: High school in Rayong City, Amphoe Mueang Rayong, Rayong province. Many students and janitors claim this school is haunted. This place used to be a prison in the past.
 Mae Ram Phueng Beach: The beach is a famous tourist attraction of Rayong province. However, many drowning victims led it to be called "Haunted Beach" or "Man-eater Beach". Those who visit or stay here often experience hauntings.
 Abandoned Scout Camp: Located in Rayong province founded in 1974. There was one scout drowned, and then there was the sight of his spirit. Today at the entrance there's a statue of a scout with a lot of sacrifice especially grenadine. The story of this place was told on radio program. It has been adapted into a horror film Black Full Moon in 2017.
 Krasae Bon Cave: Cave in the rain forest in Tambon Krasae Bon, Amphoe Klaeng, Rayong province, it is about 500 meters from the nearest village. Locals often hear Thai music sounds from within and see strange lights floating from the cave.
 Ko Kham Noi: A small island near Ko Sichang, Chonburi province in the gulf of Thailand is about an hour's drive from Pattaya shore.  It is a graveyard of many nationalities, and many religions. In the past, locals called it "Ghost Island". It was considered a very haunted island. Once upon a time, teenagers came to hunt for ghosts and heard mysterious sounds and saw a ghost of Muslim.
Saphan Bang Pakong: The bridge across Bang Pakong River, Amphoe Bang Pakong, Chachoengsao province, there are people who claim to meet a middle-aged woman or a woman in red, aged not over 30, beckoning them to jump into the river together. This point has had many people jump in to kill themselves. Local police said that since 1992, there have been more than 60 suicides.

Northern
 Chiang Mai University: The first public research university in northern Thailand founded in 1964. There are stories about ghosts, such as the seventh women dorm with the mysterious sound at night "Pok...Pok...Crued". Rumor says it is the sound of one student dragging herself over the stairs to get back to her room after being fatally assaulted, or the story of pink room etc. This mysterious sound has been created as one part of the Sahamongkol Film International's horror film Haunted Universities in 2009.
 Mae Usu Cave: The largest cave in Mae Moei National Park, Tak province. The indigenous S'gaw people, believe it is home to a fierce devil called Suea Saming, a half-human, half-tiger creature similar to  Skin-walker or Werecat, that tries to lure people into its dwelling during a full moon by traditional Thai music.
 Ladda Land: An abandoned botanical garden and amusement park including townhouse. The closure of the business since the early 1980s is one of the places in Chiang Mai province where the haunted. Its story was adapted into a GTH's film Ladda Land in 2011. It is located near the 700th Anniversary Stadium.
 Din Piang Cave: A cave on Phu Bo Bid in Tambon Kut Pong, Amphoe Mueang Loei, Loei province. In late September 2016, a strange footprint was discovered with only three toes. The locals believe that be the footprints of Phi kong koi, a hairy forest vampire with one leg and small shaped like a little boy.
 Field of Ban Thung Hee: A field of Ban Thung Hee, Tambon Wang Sai Kham, Amphoe Wang Nuea, Lampang province. On December 9, 2017, one villager found a strange human footprints and larger than usual. They have a length of 30 cm and a distance of up to 170 cm each. Therefore, it is believed that these are not ordinary human footprints. The villagers believe that they are the footprints of tutelary, locally known as Phra Chao Noke.

Northeastern (Isan region)

 Kamchanod Forest: is on a small island cut off by small waterways near the village of Tambon Wang Tong, Amphoe Ban Dung, Udon Thani province, and its dense forest is reputed by most locals to be the underground kingdom of the mythical Phaya Naga and one place of its most famous ghost stories.
 Submafai Forest: A forest area in Thap Lan National Park, in mid-September 2017 one 73-year-old local woman went to collect mushrooms in the forest. She said that she was taken by a woman in green traditional Thai clothing to a house in the forest. She was well-groomed while her relatives searched for two days. Eventually, they found out that she had lost into the forest for two days, but her body condition is still remarkably clean despite the rain throughout.
 Tamle Forest: A forest area in Amphoe Chum Phuang, Nakhon Ratchasima province, it is similar to Submafai Forest case, one young man has been lost in the forest for five days in early September 2017. He claimed that he could find an exit by following a mysterious woman dressed in green Thai dress. Locals there are rumored to be this forest has a paranormal place.
 Rural villages in Buriram: Two villages in rural area of Amphoe Chamni, Buriram province. The villagers are two women, one an 18-year-old teenager and another a 59-year-old woman, assert that they see flying cryptid, shaped like a big winged man in the night like Mothman or Ahool called Krahang in mid-July 2017. In particular, the 59-year-old woman said she had found it in her dreams for a long time, and she believed it came from a deserted house in the neighborhood. It is a house to one of her family once lived.
 Phanom Rung Historical Park: A Khmer rock temple complex set on the rim of an extinct volcano in Buriram province, founded since the 10th century to dedicate to the Shiva, one of the supreme gods of Hinduism. This place at night, it has been reported that people are exposed to harmful tall hungry ghost Preta.

Southern

 Lipe Island: Located in the Andaman Sea, Lipe is inhabited by the Chao-Le, an ethnic group nicknamed the "Gypsies of the Andaman Sea". The Chao-Le have animist beliefs and say their island is full of rowdy spirits which they call ha-too. Tourists also claim feeling the presence of invisible forces during their stays there. Residents are said to be able to appease these spirits with offerings of cupcakes and cold strawberry soft drinks.
 Wang Song Phi Nong Forest: A forest area in Tambon Phichit, Amphoe Na Mom, Songkhla province. In August 2017, a 38-year-old man lost in this forest for seven days. He said he saw people searching for him, but when he called no one hears. A medium claims that he has been hidden by the spirit of his wife in the previous life. That's surprising, even though he was lost for seven days. But his body isn't weak at all.
 Sarasin Bridge: The bridge between Phang Nga and Phuket provinces. Is a place of the suicide of a young couple, an unloving lover on February 22, 1973. Locals are rumored that on the full moon night. There will a be a pair of white rabbits with red glowing eyes appearing on the bridge. Believed to be the soul of the couple.
 Chumphon Railway Bridge: The railway bridge is part of the southern line in the area of Amphoe Pathio, Chumphon province.  There are many deaths at here; the locals called "Bridge 100 bodies". The story of it was broadcast on the popular paranormal TV program Khon Uad Phee in August 2013.
 Khao Lak: Phang Nga's famous marine attraction in late 2004 tsunami tragedy, there are hundreds of deaths. And since then, the hotels in this zone became haunted hotel.

See also
 Thai ghosts
 List of reportedly haunted locations

References

Thai ghosts
Thailand-related lists
Thailand